Dick Grimmond (born 6 July 1938) is a former Australian rules footballer who played for Richmond in the Victorian Football League (VFL).

From his debut in the fifth round of the 1959 VFL season until midway through the 1964 season, Grimmond did not miss a single game for Richmond.

Grimmond usually played as a wingman and after being appointed captain-coach of North Hobart in 1965, promptly steered the club to a Grand Final loss. He represented Tasmania in the 1966 Hobart Carnival.

References

Holmesby, Russell and Main, Jim (2007). The Encyclopedia of AFL Footballers. 7th ed. Melbourne: Bas Publishing.

1938 births
Living people
Australian rules footballers from New South Wales
Richmond Football Club players
North Hobart Football Club players
North Hobart Football Club coaches
Albury Football Club players
Wodonga Football Club players